The Amsterdam Tournament was a pre-season association football competition, held in Amsterdam, Netherlands. The competition was hosted by Eredivisie club Ajax at the Amsterdam Arena. It was inaugurated in 1975 as the Amsterdam 700 Tournament to celebrate 700 years of history in the city. It was held annually each summer until 1992, when the last edition of the original tournament was played. It returned in 1999 with the backing of the International Event Partnership (IEP). Four teams participate in the competition, played in a league format since 1986.

Since its return, the tournament has used an unusual point scoring system. As with most league competitions, three points are awarded for a win, one for a draw and zero for a loss. An additional point, however, is awarded for each goal scored. The system is designed to reward teams that adopt a more attacking style of play. Each entrant plays two matches, with the winner being the club that finishes at the top of the table. The original competition was held at Amsterdam's Olympic Stadium, where Ajax played its international games until 1996. The Amsterdam Arena, now named the Johan Cruyff Arena, has played host to the event since the return until 2009.

The first winners were Belgian club Molenbeek, who defeated Ajax 5–2 in the final. The hosts are the most successful club in the tournament's history, having lifted the trophy on ten occasions. The club won their first title in 1978 and their most recent success came in 2004. Fellow Dutch side AZ and English club Arsenal are the only other teams to have won the competition more than once. Feyenoord, Ajax's domestic rivals, are among a group of clubs to have won the tournament once, while Belgium has produced the most individual winners, four, one more than England and Netherlands.

AZ and Arsenal are also the most regular guests, having been invited to compete in the tournament on six occasions. As well as being the most successful club, Ajax has finished as runners-up eleven times. Next in the list are two Italian clubs, Internazionale and Roma, who has finished in second place five times between them. Romania is the only national team to have taken part in the tournament. They were invited in 1984 and finished in fourth place as Atlético Mineiro became the first Brazilian club to lift the trophy. In total, teams from 13 countries have participated in the competition. The 2010 edition did not take place due to Ajax's involvement in the qualifying stages of the Champions League.

Table key

 /  / 

 / Germany

Tournaments

Statistics

See also 
 Copa Amsterdam
 Future Cup

References

Specific

General

External links
 

 
AFC Ajax
Sports competitions in Amsterdam
Dutch football friendly trophies
Recurring sporting events established in 1975
1975 establishments in the Netherlands